In baseball statistics, an error is an act, in the judgment of the official scorer, of a fielder misplaying a ball in a manner that allows a batter or baserunner to advance one or more bases or allows an at bat to continue after the batter should have been put out. Shortstop, abbreviated SS, is a baseball or softball fielding position in the infield, commonly stationed between second and third base, which is considered to be among the most demanding defensive positions. The position is mostly filled by defensive specialists, so shortstops are generally relatively poor batters who typically hit lower in the batting order. In the numbering system used to record defensive plays, the shortstop is assigned the number 6.

The list of career leaders is dominated by players from the 19th century when fielding equipment was very rudimentary; baseball gloves only began to steadily gain acceptance in the 1880s, and were not uniformly worn until the mid-1890s, resulting in a much lower frequency of defensive miscues. 13 of the top 18 players in career errors began playing in the 19th century, six of whom played their entire careers before 1900; only one of the top 24 made their major league debut after 1915, and none of the top 38 were active after 1950. The top 12 single-season totals were all recorded before 1894, the top 61 were recorded before 1909, and the top 187 were recorded before 1919; none of the top 500 have been recorded since 1951. To a large extent, the leaders reflect longevity rather than lower skill. Luis Aparicio, whose 366 errors are the most by any American League (AL) shortstop since 1940, won nine Gold Glove Awards for defensive excellence, and retired with the second highest fielding percentage in AL history.

Herman Long, who retired in 1904 after setting major league records for games and putouts as a shortstop, is the all-time leader in errors committed as a shortstop with 1,070, nearly three times as many as any shortstop active since 1960, and the most by any player at a single position in major league history; he is the only shortstop to commit over 1,000 career errors. Bill Dahlen (975), Germany Smith (973), and Tommy Corcoran (961) are the only other shortstops to commit over 900 career errors. Elvis Andrus, who had 219 errors through the 2022 season to place him 120th all-time, is the leader among active players.

Key

List

Other Hall of Famers

References

Baseball-Reference.com

Major League Baseball statistics
Major League Baseball lists